Leonardo Maekawa Moreno (born August 4, 1992) is a Mexican former competitive ice dancer. With his sister, Pilar Maekawa Moreno, he competed at three Four Continents Championships from 2013 to 2015. The two were coached by Marina Zueva, Matt Willis, and Oleg Epstein.

Programs 
(with Pilar Maekawa Moreno)

Competitive highlights 
CS: Challenger Series; JGP: Junior Grand Prix

With Pilar Maekawa Moreno

References

External links 
 

1992 births
Mexican ice dancers
Living people
Sportspeople from Mexico City